Garcinia linii is a species of flowering plant in the family Clusiaceae. It is found only in Taiwan. It is threatened by habitat loss.

References

Endemic flora of Taiwan
Endangered plants
linii
Taxonomy articles created by Polbot